The Big Break VII: Reunion at Reunion featured sixteen competitors from previous seasons of The Big Break returning to compete for PGA, Champions and LPGA Tour exemptions at the Reunion Resort & Club in Orlando, Florida.  The series premiered on The Golf Channel on February 25, 2007 and was won by Tommy "Two Gloves" Gainey, who originally competed on The Big Break IV: USA vs. Europe.

Competitors included:
 Mark "Moose" Farnham, The Big Break I
 Don Donatello, The Big Break II
 Mike Foster, Jr., The Big Break II
 David Gunas, Jr., The Big Break II
 Pamela (Crikelair) Garrity, The Big Break III: Ladies Only
 Cindy Miller, The Big Break III
 Valeria Ochoa, The Big Break III
 Tommy "Two Gloves" Gainey, The Big Break IV: USA vs. Europe
 Edoardo Gardino, The Big Break IV
 Nikki DiSanto, The Big Break V: Hawaii
 Kim Lewellen, The Big Break V
 Ashley Gomes, The Big Break VI: Trump National
 Laura London, The Big Break VI
 Kelly Murray, The Big Break VI
 Gary Ostrega, The Big Break VI
 Briana Vega, The Big Break VI women's champion

Laura London indicated in her interview that The Big Break VII was actually cast well before the completion of filming of The Big Break VI and before London herself had been eliminated.

Show format
Each show will feature two to three challenges, the outcome of each influencing who stays and who goes home. Each challenge will demand precision shot-making designed to simulate conditions that players face every week on tour.

Competitions in The Big Break VII are coed team events with the losing duos going to an Elimination Challenge. The coed teams were formed by pairing the top female & top male, 2nd best female & 2nd best male, etc. The teams were then seeded by their performance in the next challenge. Each week, only half of the duos played. Duos alternated from being exempt for the episode, to playing for survival the next episode. Competitions in The Big Break VII are coed team events with the losing duos going to an Elimination Challenge. Once there, teams are split and males compete against males and female take on other females.

The original duos were:
 Ashley & Don (#1 seed)
 Kim & Mike (#2 seed)
 Bri & Tommy
 Nikki & Kelly
 Laura & Mark
 Cindy & Gary
 Pamela & Dave
 Valerie & Edoardo

Once down to eight players, the competition became every man and woman for themselves. This change of format mocked the original format seen in the earlier seasons. Unlike the previous season, only one person would win, rather than the top person from each gender.

Elimination Chart

1 In episode 1, nobody was eliminated. However, teams competed for the top seed and a $5,000 bonus. The team of Don Donatello (Big Break II) /Ashley Gomes (Big Break VI) edged out the Mike Foster (Big Break II) / Kim Lewellen (Big Break V) duo by one point to win the top seed.
2 In episode 6, it was announced that the current duos were disbanded and the remaining contestants would compete as individuals for the rest of the series. 
3 In episode 6, Don won the ultimate immunity competition. The victory was worth either $5,000 or a one-time immunity that can be used at any point until the competition is whittled down to four players. Nobody was eliminated in this episode
4 Due to conflict with other players, Pamela withdrew from the competition. 
5 Donatello decided to play the Elimination Challenge rather than turn in the Ultimate Immunity he won in episode 6. Despite having immunity in his back pocket, Don was eliminated.
6 For the first time in Big Break history, the finals began at the final 3, rather than the final 2. Mike was eliminated in the first half of the stroke play match after he failed to win a sudden death match over Ashley.
7 Tommy won "The Big Break VII: Reunion at Reunion" after defeating Ashley in the 2nd half of the match play final. The final was nine holes and Tommy won 3 & 1.

 Pink indicates the contestant is a female.
 Blue indicates the contestant is a male.
 Green background and WIN means the contestant won matchplay final and The Big Break.
 Blue background and WIN means the contestant won immunity from the elimination challenge.
 Light blue background and HIGH means the contestant had a higher score in the elimination challenge.
 White background and IN means the contestant had a good enough score in the elimination challenge to move onto the next episode.
 Orange background and LOW means the contestant had one of the lower scores for the elimination challenge.
 Gray background and IN means the contestant had the episode off and was therefore safe.
 Hot pink background and QUIT means the contestant withdrew from the competition.

 Red background and OUT means the contestant was eliminated from the competition

Notes

Big Break VII: Reunion at Reunion, The
Reunion, Florida
Television shows filmed in Florida